TianoCore EDK II (formerly Tiano) is the reference implementation of UEFI by Intel. EDK is the abbreviation for EFI Development Kit and is developed by the TianoCore community. TianoCore EDK II is the de facto standard generic UEFI services implementation.

History 
In 2004, Intel released their "Foundation Code" of their EFI implementation using a free license. This later evolved into EDK and EDK II, within the TianoCore community. EDK II was released in 2010 under the package known as "UEFI Development Kit" (UDK2010).

Although EDK II implements the UEFI specification, it is not endorsed by the UEFI Forum.

Projects 

EDK II code has been integrated into other projects.

A part of TianoCore is the UEFI shell. When a specific UEFI vendor does not support an UEFI shell feature, the UEFI shell from TianoCore can be used.

Coreboot 
In 2013, project PIANO was merged into coreboot. It gained EDK II support in 2017.

Project Mu 
Project Mu is a fork of EDK-II by Microsoft. It is an open source release of the UEFI core used in Microsoft Surface and Hyper-V products initiated by Microsoft in December 2018. The project promotes the idea of Firmware as a Service. The project was started to replace TianoCore's edk2 implementation to improve quality tests of the competing open source UEFI core.

EFIDroid 
EFIDroid is a bootloader for Android devices based on Snapdragon processors that is based on EDK-II.

References

External links 
 
 
 

Free BIOS implementations
Firmware
Custom firmware
Software related to embedded Linux
Software using the BSD license
Free software programmed in C
Free software programmed in C++